Zober is a surname. Notable people with the surname include:

Hannelore Zober (born 1946), German handball player
Rich Zober (born 1966), American racing driver
Sandra Zober (1927–2011), American actor
Yarone Zober (born 1975), politician